Yigal Antebi (born August 1, 1974 in Rishon LeZion) is an Israeli former football player who now manages.

He played in Hapoel Tel Aviv for 10 years and for the Israeli national team for 5 years.
Antebi started his senior career in Maccabi Herzliya and later on, he moved to Hakoah Ramat Gan. in 1999, he signed in Hapoel Tel Aviv and in the same year he won the "Double" (Israel league champion's and the Israeli Cup).

He has won 11 caps in the Israeli national team and made 1 assist.

Honours
Israeli Premier League (1):
1999–00
Israel State Cup (4):
2000, 2006, 2007, 2012
Toto Cup (1):
2001–02

References

External links
Stats at ONE

1974 births
Living people
Israeli footballers
Israel international footballers
Footballers from Rishon LeZion
Maccabi Herzliya F.C. players
Sektzia Ness Ziona F.C. players
Hakoah Maccabi Ramat Gan F.C. players
Hapoel Tel Aviv F.C. players
Maccabi Netanya F.C. players
Hapoel Petah Tikva F.C. players
Hapoel Nahlat Yehuda F.C. players
Liga Leumit players
Israeli Premier League players
Israeli football managers
Hapoel Afula F.C. managers
Hapoel Herzliya F.C. managers
Hapoel Nir Ramat HaSharon F.C. managers
Maccabi Sha'arayim F.C. managers
Association football defenders